Madison Square Presbyterian Church may refer to two churches in Manhattan, New York City:

Madison Square Presbyterian Church, New York City (1854), designed by Richard Upjohn
Madison Square Presbyterian Church, New York City (1906), designed by Stanford White